The Castle of Barisciano (Italian: Castello di Barisciano)  is a  medieval castle in Barisciano, province of L'Aquila, Abruzzo, southern Italy.

History 
In the 13th century it was enlarged as an enclosure castle into accommodate the population in case of danger.

The castle took part in the founding of the city of L'Aquila and it was attacked and destroyed by the condottiero Braccio da Montone on 23 April 1424 during the siege of that city. It was still included as part of L'Aquila until 1529, when it became a fief of aristocratic families. Around the 16th century, it lost its defensive role and was abandoned.

In memory of the epidemic occurred in 1526, the church of Saint Roch was built close to one of the castle's towers and it houses a wooden statue of the saint and some frescoes.

Architecture 
The castle enclosure has a rectangular shape with a perimeter of about a kilometer. The main pentagonal tower was placed in the top apex and other towers were placed along the curtain wall, for a total of eight towers.

Inside the walls there are remains of other buildings even if, like the castle, they were not permanently inhabited.

References

External links 

 

Barisciano
Barisciano